AMD Instinct is AMD's brand of professional GPUs. It replaced AMD's FirePro S brand in 2016. Compared to the Radeon brand of mainstream consumer/gamer products, the Instinct product line is intended to accelerate deep learning, artificial neural network, and high-performance computing/GPGPU applications.

The Radeon Instinct product line directly competes with Nvidia's Ampere and Intel Xeon Phi and incoming Intel Xe lines of machine learning and GPGPU cards.

Before MI100 introduction in November 2020, the Instinct family was known as AMD Radeon Instinct, AMD dropped the Radeon brand from its name.

Supercomputers based on (AMD CPUs and) AMD Instinct GPUs now take the lead on the Green500 supercomputer list with over 50% lead over any other, and top the first 4 spots, including the second, which is the current fastest in the world on the TOP500 list, Frontier.

Products 

The three initial Radeon Instinct products were announced on December 12, 2016, and released on June 20, 2017, with each based on a different architecture.

MI6 
The MI6 is a passively cooled, Polaris 10 based card with 16 GB of GDDR5 memory and with a <150 W TDP. At 5.7 TFLOPS (FP16 and FP32), the MI6 is expected to be used primarily for inference, rather than neural network training. The MI6 has a peak double precision (FP64) compute performance of 358 GFLOPS.

MI8 
The MI8 is a Fiji based card, analogous to the R9 Nano, and expected to have a <175W TDP. The MI8 has 4 GB of High Bandwidth Memory. At 8.2 TFLOPS (FP16 and FP32), the MI8 is marked toward inference. The MI8 has a peak (FP64) double precision compute performance 512 GFLOPS.

MI25 
The MI25 is a Vega based card, utilizing HBM2 memory. The MI25 performance is expected to be 12.3 TFLOPS using FP32 numbers. In contrast to the MI6 and MI8, the MI25 is able to increase performance when using lower precision numbers, and accordingly is expected to reach 24.6 TFLOPS when using FP16 numbers. The MI25 is rated at <300W TDP with passive cooling. The MI25 also provides 768 GFLOPS peak double precision (FP64) at 1/16th rate.

Software

ROCm 
Following software is, as of 2022, regrouped under the Radeon Open Compute meta-project.

MxGPU 
The MI6, MI8, and MI25 products all support AMD's MxGPU virtualization technology, enabling sharing of GPU resources across multiple users.

MIOpen 
MIOpen is AMD's deep learning library to enable GPU acceleration of deep learning. Much of this extends the GPUOpen's Boltzmann Initiative software. This is intended to compete with the deep learning portions of Nvidia's CUDA library. It supports the deep learning frameworks: Theano, Caffe, TensorFlow, MXNet, Microsoft Cognitive Toolkit, Torch, and Chainer. Programming is supported in OpenCL and Python, in addition to supporting the compilation of CUDA through AMD's Heterogeneous-compute Interface for Portability and Heterogeneous Compute Compiler.

Chipset table

See also 
 ROCm - AMD's open compute software stack
 AMD FirePro - AMD's predecessor to Radeon Instinct
 AMD Radeon Pro - AMD's workstation graphics and GPGPU solution
 Nvidia Quadro - Nvidia's competing workstation graphics solution
 Nvidia Tesla - Nvidia's competing GPGPU solution
 Xeon Phi - Intel's competing massively-parallel multicore processor line
 List of AMD graphics processing units

References

External links 
 AMD Instinct accelerators web page

Coprocessors
AMD graphics cards
GPGPU
Parallel computing